Philip B. Wachtel (October 27, 1851 – November 14, 1913) was a Democratic politician from Michigan who served in the Michigan House of Representatives, including as Speaker of the House during the 36th Legislature. He also served, prior to his election to the House, as village president and later, after his service in the House, as mayor of Petoskey.

Wachtel was also the Fusion Party candidate for Michigan Secretary of State in 1886 and a Democratic candidate for the Michigan Senate in 1910.

Wachtel died on November 14, 1913, in Petoskey, Michigan.

References

Wachtel, Philip B.
Year of death unknown
Speakers of the Michigan House of Representatives
Democratic Party members of the Michigan House of Representatives
Mayors of places in Michigan
People from Petoskey, Michigan